San Wai Court is a Home Ownership Scheme court developed by the Hong Kong Housing Authority in Tuen Mun, New Territories, Hong Kong near Castle Peak and Tsing Shan Monastery. Formerly the old site of Leung Tin Village, the estate consists of six residential blocks completed in 1989. It is named from the nearby San Wai Tsai and it is the only HOS court in Tuen Mun which is not named with the prefix "Siu". Light Rail San Wai stop is located at San Wai Court and it is named from the court.

Houses

Demographics
According to the 2016 by-census, San Wai Court had a population of 5,768. The median age was 48.5 and the majority of residents (98.8 per cent) were of Chinese ethnicity. The average household size was 2.9 people. The median monthly household income of all households (i.e. including both economically active and inactive households) was HK$28,880.

Politics
San Wai Court is located in San King constituency of the Tuen Mun District Council. It was formerly represented by Catherine Wong Lai-sheung, who was elected in the 2019 elections until July 2021.

See also

Public housing estates in Tuen Mun

References

Residential buildings completed in 1989
Home Ownership Scheme
Tuen Mun